Jenny Byrne (born 25 February 1967) is a former tennis player from Australia who turned professional in 1987 and retired from the tour in 1997. Her career-high world rankings were world No. 45 in singles (in 1989) and world No. 27 in doubles (in 1988).

Byrne finished runner-up in the mixed-doubles competition at Wimbledon in 1989, partnering Mark Kratzmann. In 1992, she won the Women's Tennis Association's 'Comeback Player of the Year' award. As a junior player, Byrne won the girls' singles title at the Australian Open and finished runner-up in the girls' singles at Wimbledon in 1985.

Grand Slam tournament finals

Mixed doubles: 1 (runner-up)

WTA career finals

Singles: 2 (2 runner-ups)

Doubles: 9 (2 titles, 7 runner-ups)

ITF finals

Singles (4–1)

Doubles (3–1)

External links
 
 

1967 births
Living people
Australian female tennis players
Tennis players at the 1992 Summer Olympics
Olympic tennis players of Australia
Sportswomen from Western Australia
Grand Slam (tennis) champions in girls' singles
Grand Slam (tennis) champions in girls' doubles
Tennis players from Perth, Western Australia
Australian Open (tennis) junior champions